Banghak-dong is a dong, neighbourhood of Dobong-gu in Seoul, South Korea.

References

External links
Dobong-gu map

Neighbourhoods of Dobong District